The Wisconsin Badgers represent the University of Wisconsin in WCHA women's ice hockey during the 2019-20 NCAA Division I women's ice hockey season. Daryl Watts would set a program record for most assists in one season with 49, while leading the NCAA with 74 points. Qualifying for the 2020 NCAA tournament, the Badgers were scheduled to face off against the Clarkson Golden Knights women's ice hockey program in the quarterfinals, but the tournament was cancelled due to the COVID-19 pandemic.

Offseason
September 3: Mercyhurst Lakers goaltender Kennedy Blair has transferred to the Badgers.

Recruiting

Regular season

Standings

Roster

2019–20 Badgers

Awards and honors
 Abby Roque, 2019-20 Preseason WCHA Co-Player of the Year 
Abby Roque: 2020 All-WCHA First Team 
Abby Roque: 2020 First Team All-American 
Abby Roque: 2020 WCHA Player of the Year 
Abby Roque: 2020 USCHO D-1 Women's Player of the Year 
Abby Roque: Bob Allen Women's Hockey Player of the Year (Awarded by USA Hockey)
Sophie Shirley, 2020 All-WCHA Second Team
Mekenzie Steffen, 2020 All-WCHA Second Team
Daryl Watts: 2020 All-WCHA First Team

Team awards
Badger Award (presented to the player who inspires others through her commitment to hard work and unselfish play): Alexis Mauermann
Jeff Sauer Award (given to the player who consistently demonstrates dedication to her teammates, coaches and the sport of hockey): Kristen Campbell. NOTE: It marked the third straight season that Campbell won the award.
Defensive Player of the Year honors: Mekenzie Steffen 
Offensive Player of the Year honors: (tie) Abby Roque and Daryl Watts.
 Freshman of the Year: Chayla Edwards
Big Ten Sportsmanship Award: Caitlin Schneider
W Club Community Service Award: Britta Curl

References

Wisconsin
Wisconsin Badgers women's ice hockey seasons
Wisconsin
Wisconsin
Wisconsin